Bhatti may refer to:

 Bhatti clan, a social group of India and Pakistan
 Bhatti (Buddhism), a type of devotion
 Bhaṭṭi, a 7th-century Sanskrit poet

People with the name 
 Adil Bhatti (born 1984), American cricketer
 Arfan Bhatti (born 1977), Norwegian Islamist, and a leading figure in the Islamic State-affiliated group Profetens Ummah
 Arif Iqbal Bhatti (died 1997), Pakistani jurist who was Judge of the Lahore High Court and was murdered for alleged blasphemy in verdict
 Arif Masih Bhatti (born 1970), Pakistani politician who had been a Member of the Provincial Assembly of Sindh, from June 2013 to May 2018
 Barbar Bhatti (born 1949), British actor of Pakistani origin
 Bhanwar Singh Bhati (born 1974), Indian politician who is serving as the State Higher Education Minister of Rajasthan
 Bilal Akbar Bhatti (born 1976), Pakistani politician who was a Member of the Provincial Assembly of the Punjab, from May 2013 to May 2018
 Bilawal Bhatti (born 1991), international cricketer from Pakistan, primarily utilized as an all-rounder
 Fouzia Bhatti (born 1979), Urdu language author, poet, and columnist from Pakistan
 Gurpreet Kaur Bhatti, ’s first play Behsharam (Shameless) broke box office records when it played at Soho Theatre and the Birmingham Rep in 2001.
 Irfan Bhatti (cricketer, born 1964), Pakistani cricketer
 Irfan Bhatti (cricketer, born 1979), Kuwaiti cricketer
 Jamie Bhatti (born 1993), Scottish international rugby union footballer who currently plays as a loose head prop for Edinburgh Rugby
 Jaspal Bhatti, former Indian comedian and actor
 Javed Bhatti, former cricketer who played first-class cricket for Bahawalpur in Pakistan from 1958 to 1975
 Mehdi Hassan Bhatti (born 1955), politician from Hafizabad District, Punjab, Pakistan
 Muhammad Ameer Bhatti (born 1962), has been Justice of the Lahore High Court since 12 May 2011
 Muhammad Irfan Saeed Bhatti (born 1992), Pakistani badminton player
 Mukhtar Bhatti (born 1932), Pakistani field hockey player. He competed in the men's tournament at the 1948 Summer Olympics
 Munir Bhatti, retired field hockey player who was a member of the Pakistan National Hockey Team from 1978 to 1979. He was born in Sialkot. A half back, he was capped by Pakistan 13 times, scoring no goals
 Nighat Intisar Bhatti (born 1966), Pakistani politician who had been a Member of the Provincial Assembly of the Punjab, from May 2014 to May 2018
 Omer Bhatti (born 1984), Norwegian rapper and dancer
 Parveen Masood Bhatti, Pakistani politician who had been a member of the National Assembly of Pakistan, from March 2008 to May 2018
 Parwano Bhatti (1934–2016), prominent Sindhi-language poet, writer and journalist. He died at the age of 82
 Paul Bhatti, continues his struggle as Chairman of All Pakistan Minorities Alliance (APMA) and Shahbaz Bhatti Memorial Trust (SBMT)
 Rai Bhoe Bhatti (14the century), Muslim Rajput noble 
 Rai Bular Bhatti (died 1515), Muslim Rajput noble, son of the above
 Raja Aziz Bhatti (1928–1965), military officer in the Pakistan Army who was cited with the Nishan-e-Haider (Eng. Lit.: Emblem of Lion) for his actions of valor during the Battle of Burki in second war with India in 1965
 Rasheed Bhatti (born 1952), Pakistani former first-class cricketer who played for Lahore cricket team. Later he became an umpire and stood in matches in the 2005–06 ABN-AMRO Twenty-20 Cup
 Rao Bhatti, credited with establishing the modern town of Bathinda, Indian Punjab in the Lakhi jungle area in the 3rd century
 Rustam Bhatti (born 1990), Canadian cricketer of Pakistani origin who represents the Canada national cricket team. He is a right hand batsman who has also captained the Canada U-19 cricket team
 Sajid Mehmood Bhatti (born 1963), Pakistani politician. He is also founder of the Saleem Akhtar Memorial Welfare Hospital & Chairman of Pakistan Muslim League Sajid Bhatti group
 Saqib Bhatti (born 1985), British Conservative Party politician who has been the Member of Parliament (MP) for Meriden since the 2019 general election
 Shahid Hussain Bhatti, Pakistani politician who had been a member of the National Assembly of Pakistan, from September 2013 to May 2018
 Shaukat Ali Bhatti (born 1974), Pakistani politician who has been a member of the National Assembly of Pakistan since August 2018
 Sidra Nawaz (born 1994), Pakistani Cricketer
 Waseem Bhatti (born 1978), French cricketer of Pakistani origin
 Zafar Rasheed Bhatti (1950s–2020), Pakistani journalist

See also 
 
 Bhatti glass
 Bhati (disambiguation)